The regions of Singapore are urban planning subdivisions demarcated by the Urban Redevelopment Authority of Singapore to aid in its planning efforts. Over time, other governmental organisations have also adopted the five regions in their administrative work, as for example the Department of Statistics in the census of 2000. The regions are further subdivided into 55 planning areas, which include two water-catchment areas.

While used by some governmental organizations, these regions are not administrative subdivisions. For administrative purposes, Singapore is divided into five districts and further divided into divisions governed by councils and headed by mayors. These subdivisions are incompatible with the regional subdivisions. The regions are fixed over time while the districts fluctuate with electoral redistricting.

Regional centres 
Prior to 1991, urban planners in Singapore preferred to have a strong commercial zone in the centre of the metropolitan area. Coupled with a disjointed residential developments in the northern and eastern areas, and industrial developments in the western areas of Singapore, this resulted in citizens having to travel across the island to their work or retail destinations. Addressing the transportation issue, the concept of regional centres was introduced in 1991 with the 1991 Master Plan. 

Internationally, regional centres are typically new urban places or self-contained independent cities with their own mix of urban functions. However, as the land mass of Singapore is small, the term, regional centre, takes on a localised meaning: a functional node that is designed to serve as a smaller-scale downtown area between town centres in new residential towns and the main central business district in the Central Area. These centres are planned to offer a variety of commercial, retail, entertainment, and other amenities to residents in the surrounding areas. They are strategically located in areas that are well-served by the Mass Rapid Transit system, an efficient bus system, and an extensive road network. These regional centres are aimed to decentralised the amenities that's previously concentrated in the city's core.

There are four regional centres in Singapore, which were identified in the 1991 Master Plan. The first regional centre to be developed was Tampines Regional Centre, located in the East Region, Singapore, alongside with the introduction of the 1991 Master Plan. Subsequently, Jurong East Regional Centre (West Region, Singapore), also known as the Jurong Lake District, was being developed next in 2008, with renewed plans unveiled in 2023. Woodlands Regional Centre (WRC) (North Region, Singapore) was mooted in 2014. In addition to the existing road and rail link on the Johor–Singapore Causeway, WRC would be connected to the neighbouring Johor Bahru city in Malaysia via the Johor Bahru–Singapore Rapid Transit System by 2026. Lastly, plans for Seletar Regional Centre (North-East Region, Singapore) has yet to be unveiled.

List of regions
Population figures are as of 30 June 2020. They include citizens and permanent residents but do not include the approximately 1.6 million non-permanent residents of Singapore.

See also
Planning Areas of Singapore
Subdivisions of Singapore

References

External links
Urban Redevelopment Authority
GoogleMap

 
 
Subdivisions of Singapore
Urban planning in Singapore